Eric Segelberg (20 December 1920 – 17 October 2001) was a Swedish theologian and a priest of the Lutheran Church of Sweden.

Biography
Segelberg was born in Nyköping, Sweden. He was ordained to the priesthood in 1944, and he continued to study theology and classics at both Uppsala and Oxford Universities, receiving a doctorate in history of religion. His dissertation in 1958 was titled "Maşbūtā. Studies in the Ritual of the Mandæan Baptism". He became professor of classics at Dalhousie University, Canada, in 1968. As professor emeritus he returned to Sweden. Widely known in many fields, he specialized in study of patristics, the Mandeans and Gnosticism. His main specialization was in liturgics. His quite outstanding liturgical knowledge characterized his studies in the history of religion. Well-known are his studies "The Benedictio Olei in the Apostolic Tradition of Hippolytus", (Oriens Christianus 48, 1964), and "The Ordination of the Mandæan tarmida and its Relation to Jewish and Early Christian Ordination Rites", (Studia Patristica 10, 1970).

Segelberg was member of the Societas Sanctae Birgittae and in Sweden a well-known member of the Swedish high-church movement Arbetsgemenskapen Kyrklig Förnyelse ("The Church Union in Sweden"). He established a trust in 1984 to enhance Christian theological research, education and youth work. In Sweden he founded  ('the Segelberg Foundation for Liturgical Research), sited in Uppsala, Sweden. In 1990 a Festschrift to him was published, collecting a number of his own writings: Gnostica – mandaica – liturgica. Opera eius ipsius selecta & collecta septuagenario Erico Segelberg oblata curantibus Jan Bergman, Jan Hjärpe, Per Ström una cum Bibliographia Segelbergiana ab Oloph Bexell redacta (Acta Universitatis Upsaliensis. Historia Religionum 11.). He died in Uppsala in 2001.

References 

Academic staff of the Dalhousie University
20th-century Swedish Lutheran priests
Swedish theologians
Religious studies scholars
Scholars of Mandaeism
1920 births
2001 deaths
20th-century Protestant theologians